HMAS Pioneer (formerly HMS Pioneer) was a  protected cruiser built for the Royal Navy at the end of the 19th century. She was transferred to the fledgling Royal Australian Navy (RAN) in 1912. During World War I, the cruiser captured two German merchant ships, and was involved in the East African Campaign, including the blockade of the cruiser  and a bombardment of Dar-es-Salaam. She returned to Australia in late 1916 and was decommissioned. Pioneer was used as an accommodation ship for the following six years, then was stripped down and sold off by 1926. The cruiser was scuttled outside Sydney Heads in 1931.

Design and construction
Pioneer was a third-class protected cruiser of the nine-ship Pelorus or P class. Propulsion was supplied by inverted three-cylinder triple expansion steam engines, providing  to two propeller shafts.

The cruiser was armed with eight single QF  guns, eight single QF 3-pounder guns, two field guns, three Maxim machine guns, and two  torpedo tubes sited above the waterline. The ship's company initially stood at 225, but this was later reduced to 188; 12 officers, and 176 sailors.

Pioneer was laid down for the Royal Navy at HM Dockyard, Chatham, Kent on 16 December 1897. She was launched 28 June 1899 by Miss Andoe, daughter of the dockyard's admiral superintendent. Pioneer underwent steaming trials on 2 September making 17.6 knots during six runs over the measured mile off Maplin Sands.  The cruiser was completed on 23 January 1900, and was placed in reserve until her commissioning on 10 July 1900.

Operational history
Pioneer spent the majority of 1900 in British waters, before sailing for the Mediterranean Fleet under the command of Commander Hugh Evan-Thomas on 15 November. Commander George Hope was appointed in command on 5 July 1902, taking up the command later that month after a visit by the ship to Brindisi. In late December 1902 she was in Greek waters when she visited Astakos in the Ionian Sea with HMS Irresistible and HMS Bulwark. The ship remained in the Mediterranean until returning to Chatham on 20 November 1904. Pioneer was decommissioned until 5 September 1905, when she was reactivated for service as a drill ship with the Australian Squadron of the Royal Navy.

On 29 November 1912, Pioneer was decommissioned and gifted to the Australian government, who commissioned the ship as part of the Royal Australian Navy on 1 March 1913. Initially used as a tender for the naval base at Garden Island, New South Wales, Pioneer was refitted during the second half of 1913, and on 1 January 1914, was reassigned for reservist training.

At the start of World War I, Pioneer sailed from Victoria to Western Australia, where she served as a patrol vessel. On 16 August, she captured the German merchant ship Neumunster, which was taken by the Australian government as a prize of war and renamed Cooee. Ten days later, the cruiser captured a second German ship, the Norddeutscher Lloyd liner Thuringen, which was presented to the government of India for use as a troop transport. On 1 November, Pioneer joined the escort of the convoy transporting the Australian and New Zealand Army Corps to Egypt as a replacement for the Japanese cruiser Nisshin, and with orders to check on the Cocos Islands during the voyage. However, as the Australian warship took up position, she suffered a major engine malfunction, and  joined the convoy instead.

In late December, the cruiser was assigned to the blockade of German East Africa, and sailed for Zanzibar on 9 January 1915. On arrival, Pioneer was ordered to help contain the German cruiser  in the Rufiji River and prevent German supply ships from arriving. Königsberg was scuttled on 12 July following shelling by two monitors, although Pioneer remained in the region until 31 August, when she sailed to Simon's Town in South Africa for a six-week refit. Pioneer returned to uneventful patrols of German East Africa on 22 October, and continued until early February 1916, when the Admiralty instructed the ship to return to Australia. However, before she could leave, demands by General Jan Smuts for more Admiralty involvement in the East African Campaign saw Pioneer return to patrols on 24 February. On 30 July, the cruiser fired 100 4-inch shells during the bombardment of Dar-es-Salaam.

Decommissioning and fate
Pioneer was ordered to return to Australia on 8 August 1916, and was paid off on 7 November 1916. Despite being "obsolete and decrepit" she saw more actual combat than any other Australian ship of World War I. Pioneer returned to Garden Island and was used as an accommodation vessel until 1922. She was handed to Cockatoo Island Dockyard for stripping in May 1923, was passed to the control of the Commonwealth Shipping Board in 1924, who then sold the hulk to H. P. Stacey of Sydney, in 1926. The ship was scuttled off Sydney Heads on 18 February 1931.

The location of the wreck was lost until March 2014, when it was rediscovered by wreck-hunters analysing data taken from the research vessel Southern Surveyor.

Following a reorganisation of the RAN battle honours system, completed in March 2010, Pioneer was retroactively awarded the honour "German East Africa 1915–16" in recognition of her wartime service.

Citations

References

Further reading

External links

 

 

Pelorus-class cruisers of the Royal Navy
Ships built in Chatham
1899 ships
Pelorus-class cruisers of the Royal Australian Navy
World War I cruisers of Australia
Scuttled vessels of New South Wales
Shipwrecks in the Tasman Sea
Maritime incidents in 1931